The following is a list of compositions by Spanish composer Juan Crisóstomo Arriaga. The list only consists of known or referenced compositions, as Arriaga died at a very early age. Some of these compositions might be edited or not completed.

By chronological order 

 Nada y mucho, for octet (1817)
 Overture "Nonetto", Op. 1, for small orchestra (1818)
 Military March, Op. 2, for band (1819)
 Hymn "Ya luce..." ("Patria"), Op. 3, for choir and orchestra (1819)
 Hymn "Cántabros nobles...", Op. 4, for choir and orchestra (1819)
 Romanza, for piano (1819)
 Los esclavos felices, opera in two acts for soloists, choir and orchestra (1820) (lost, only the overture and sketches survived)
 Tema variado en cuarteto, Op. 17, for string quartet (1820)
 Overture in D major, Op. 20, for orchestra (1821)
 Motet "Stabat Mater", for two tenors, bass and orchestra (1821)
 Motet "O Salutaris", for two tenors, bass and orchestra (1821)
 Variaciones sobre el tema de la Húngara, Op. 22, for violin and basso continuo (1821)
 Variaciones sobre el tema de la Húngara, Op. 23, for string quartet (1822)
 Aria de Beltrán, for tenor and orchestra (1822)
 Three Etudes or Capriccios, for piano (1822)
 Motet "O salutes hostia", for two tenors, basso continuo and string orchestra (1823)
 Fugue in eight voices "Et vitam venturi" (1823) (lost)
 Three Quartets (1823)
 String Quartet No. 1 in D minor
 String Quartet No. 2 in A major
 String Quartet No. 3 in E flat major
 Symphony in D major, "Sinfonía a gran orquesta" (1824)
 Canon of Henneville (1824)
 Mass in four voices (1824) (lost)
 Salve Regina (1824) (lost)
 Médée, opera for soprano and orchestra (1825) (unfinished, only the aria survived)
 Ma tante Aurore (All' Aurora), duo for tenor, basso continuo and orchestra (1825)
 Edipo, for tenor and orchestra (1825) (only the Aria of Polinicio survived)
 Herminie, cantata for soprano and orchestra (1825)
 Agar, cantata for soprano, tenor and orchestra (1825)

Works without date of composition 

 Audi benigne, for choir.

References 

Arriaga, Juan Crisostomo